Sadrabad (also Romanized as Şadrābād) is a village in Deris Rural District, in the Central District of Kazerun County, Fars Province, Iran. At the 2006 census, its population was 296, in 72 families.

References 

Populated places in Kazerun County